Juan Francisco Viveros Opazo (born 11 August 1980), nicknamed El Táctico (The Tactician), is a Chilean football manager and former footballer.

Club career
As player of Sporting CP, he ran into Cristiano Ronaldo, Quaresma and Kasper Schmeichel. His last club in Chile was the Primera B side Lota Schwager.

International career
Viveros was part of the Chilean under-17 national side who participated in the 1997 FIFA U-17 World Championship. He scored two goals in the group stage against Thailand.

Managerial career
Viveros graduated as a Football Manager at the Chilean Instituto Nacional del Fútbol (Football National Institute) and has worked as manager of the Ñublense Youth Team. Previously, he worked as Coordinator for the 2015 FIFA U-17 World Cup in Chillán. On 2021 season, he joined Segunda División side Deportes Concepción as Director of Football.

Personal life
He is the nephew of the former Chilean international footballer Gustavo Viveros and cousin of Ricardo Viveros.

References

External links
 
 
 
 Juan Francisco Viveros at playmakerstats.com (English version of ceroacero.es)

1980 births
Living people
Sportspeople from Concepción, Chile
Chilean footballers
Association football forwards
Chile youth international footballers
C.D. Huachipato footballers
Sporting CP footballers
F.C. Alverca players
U.D. Leiria players
Santiago Wanderers footballers
Universidad de Concepción footballers
Ñublense footballers
Lota Schwager footballers
Halcones FC players
Comunicaciones F.C. players
Al-Ittihad SCC (Ibb) players
Chilean Primera División players
Segunda Divisão players
Primeira Liga players
Primera B de Chile players
Liga Nacional de Fútbol de Guatemala players
Yemeni League players
Chilean expatriate footballers
Expatriate footballers in Portugal
Chilean expatriate sportspeople in Portugal
Chilean expatriates in Portugal
Expatriate footballers in Guatemala
Chilean expatriate sportspeople in Guatemala
Expatriate footballers in Yemen
Chilean football managers